Huang Guozhen was a Chinese spree killer who murdered 16 people and injured two others in 1989 in the village of Nafang, Naxiang.

Sometime before the rampage killing, Huang became embroiled in a dispute with his brother, Huang Xiangbang. On the afternoon of March 19, Guozhen became intoxicated, set fire to his house and drove to his brother's house, killing his brother and his wife with a firewood knife. Guozhen then proceeded to travel to the local market and began to kill individuals at random, including children and the elderly. In total, he killed 16-17 people and injured two others.

Guozhen was eventually subdued by bystanders Huang Guoqin and local CCP party secretary Zhou Youbang. Guozhen was arrested and tried ten days later in Qinzhou. He was sentenced to death in front of a crowd of 10,000 people and was quickly executed on the same day.

References

1989 deaths
1989 murders in China
20th-century executions by China
20th-century mass murder in China
Arson in China
Chinese mass murderers
Chinese spree killers
Executed mass murderers
Executed spree killers
Fratricides
Knife attacks
Marketplace attacks in Asia
Mass stabbings in China
Massacres in China